Salem (sometimes stylized as S4LEM or SALEM) is an American electronic music band from Traverse City, Michigan. It was founded by Heather Marlatt, Jack Donoghue and John Holland. Salem is considered one of the pioneers of the witch house genre.

Salem released its debut album King Night in 2010. In 2020, the group released a mixtape, Stay Down, followed by their second album, Fires in Heaven, both without Marlatt, who is disputing her ouster.

Career
Salem was formed in 2008 by Jack Donoghue, John Holland, and Heather Marlatt. Salem released the debut studio album, King Night, in 2010. It was included on the year-end lists by AllMusic, DIY, NME, The Quietus, and Stereogum.

Salem had been inactive since 2012, with no new releases since their 2011 EP I'm Still in the Night. In 2016, a new Salem album was announced via photographer Wolfgang Tillmans' Instagram account. In that year, Salem officially returned with a remix of Tillmans' song "Make It Up as You Go Along", which was included on his Device Control EP. 

The band was inactive until May 2020, when they returned with a new mixtape titled Stay Down, which was presented on NTS Radio. The return of the band brings with it a controversy with Heather still in dispute.

Salem released their first single in nearly a decade "Starfall" on September 18, 2020, via Mad Decent's Decent Distribution. The music video follows the band's trip with veteran storm trackers through Tulsa, Oklahoma and Dallas as well as through Texas during tornado season. It was directed by Donoghue and Holland along Tommy Malekoff. In a press release, it was stated that the song was "a signal of additional work to come". Their second album Fires in Heaven, which comes ten years after their debut, was released on October 30, 2020. Along its pre-order on October 16, a new single called "Red River" was unveiled.

Style and influences
According to Heather Phares of AllMusic, Salem's sound blends ethereal electronica and slow Southern hip hop rhythms, and is noted for pioneering the music subgenre known as witch house.

Band members
Current 
 Jack Donoghue (2008-present)
 John Holland (2008-present)
Former
 Heather Marlatt (2008-2020)

Discography

Studio albums
 King Night (2010)
 Fires in Heaven (2020)

Mixtapes
 XXJFG (2009) 
 We Make It Good (2009)
 Raver Stay Wif Me (2010)
 I Buried My Heart Inna Wounded Knee (2010)
 Sleep Now My One Little Eye (2010)
 5Min2Live: Gurn Baby Gurn (2010)
 Bow Down (2011)
 On Again / Off Again (2011)
 Mother Always (2011)
 Stay Down (2020)

EPs
 Yes I Smoke Crack (2008)
 Water (2008)
 I'm Still in the Night (2011)

Singles
 "OhK" (2009)
 "Babydaddy" / "S.A.W." (2009) 
 "Frost" / "Legend" (2009)
 "Asia" (2010)
 "Starfall" (2020)
 "Red River" (2020)

Remixes
 Gucci Mane – "Bird Flu (Salem Remix)" (2009)
 Gucci Mane – "Round One (Salem Remix)" (2009)
 Playboy Tre – "Sideways (Salem Drag Chop Remix) from ATL RMX (2009)
 Gucci Mane – "My Shadow (Salem Remix)" (2010)
 Health – "In Violet (Salem RMX)" from Health::Disco2 (2010)
 HIM – "In the Arms of Rain (Salem Remix)" from SWRMXS (2010)
 These New Puritans – "Hologram (Salem Remix)" from Hidden Remixes (2010)
 Blonde Redhead – "Penny Sparkle (Salem Remix)" (2011)
 Britney Spears – "Till the World Ends (Salem Remix)" (2011)
 Charli XCX – "Stay Away (Salem's Angel Remix)" (2011)
 Interpol – "Try It On (Salem RMX)" (2011)
 Light Asylum – "Shallow Tears (Like a Storm) (Salem Remix)" (2011)
 The Cult – "Elemental Light (Salem Remix)" (2012)
 Wolfgang Tillmans – "Make It Up as You Go Along (Salem Remix)" from Device Control (2016)
Bladee & Mechatok - "Grace (Salem Remix)" (2021)

Productions
 Lil B – "Slangin Yayo" from Red Flame: Evil Edition (2010)

References

External links
 Official website
 

American musical trios
Electronic music groups from Michigan
Musical groups established in 2008
Iamsound Records artists